is a novel by Japanese writer Sawako Ariyoshi. Published by Chuokoronsha in 1959, it has been translated into English. Set in Wakayama prefecture, the novel's focus is on three generations of women representing modern Japanese history.

Bibliography

References
Ariyoshi, S., 2004. The River Ki. Trans. by Mildred Tahara. New York, NY: Kodansha America, Inc., 2004. 

1959 Japanese novels
Japanese historical novels
Novels by Sawako Ariyoshi
Novels set in Japan
Chuokoron-Shinsha books